Archibald Malcolm (Archie) Matheson was a Canadian politician who represented Vegreville in the Legislative Assembly of Alberta from 1921 until 1935.  He was elected in the 1921 election and re-elected in 1926 and 1930 as a member of the United Farmers of Alberta (UFA), which was the governing party of his entire time in office.

Despite this, Matheson frequently opposed government policy.  In January 1923 he objected to Herbert Greenfield's government's continued support of prohibition, remarking "This government has acted as philosopher, guide, and God to the people long enough."  In 1926, he expressed frustration with the John Brownlee government's delay in providing a new police station for his riding, going so far as to threaten to raise the matter in the legislature.  In February 1928, he led the opposition to Brownlee's proposal to exempt lawyers and trust companies wishing to act as real estate agents from the new $1,000 bond required of others wishing to do so.  Matheson proposed eliminating this exemption and raising the amount of the bond to $5,000.  He was partially successful: the bond remained at $1,000 and trust companies remained exempt, but lawyers were barred from the real estate business altogether.  Matheson was also an active opponent of the Sexual Sterilization Act of Alberta, and attempted to adjourn debate before it came to a vote.  When he failed, he absented himself from the final vote as a sign of protest.  He was a vocal advocate for farmers and in the 1930s proposed unsuccessfully that the government declare a moratorium on the collection of debts from them.

His aggressive approach to the government sometimes paid off, as in his lobbying for the construction of a courthouse in Vegreville.  In 1929 Vegreville was designated as a judicial subdistrict, which entitled it to court offices, a deputy sheriff, and a clerk of court.  The following year it was awarded a full courthouse.

Matheson sought re-election in the 1935 election, but finished a distant third, joining every UFA candidate in the province in defeat, as William Aberhart's new Social Credit League achieved a large majority.

Electoral record

Notes

References
 
 
 
 

Farmers from Alberta
Scottish emigrants to Canada
United Farmers of Alberta MLAs
1891 births
1978 deaths